Duranga is an Indian Hindi-language web-series an adaptation of the Korean drama Flower of Evil, directed by Pradeep Sarkar and Aijaz Khan starring Gulshan Devaiah and Drashti Dhami. It will premiere on ZEE5 on 19 August 2022.

Plot 
While investigating a gory copy-cat killing that follows the modus operandi of a 17 year old serial killing case, a Mumbai crime branch officer re-opens the spine-chilling case that had rocked a small coastal town near Mumbai, only to find out that there was an accomplice who was never nabbed. To her horror, that partner in crime could be her life partner, the doting father of her six-year-old daughter, her ‘perfect’ husband of 11 years.

Cast 
Gulshan Devaiah as Abhishek Banne/Sammit Patel
Drashti Dhami as Ira Jaykar Patel
Abhijeet Khandkekar as Vikas Sarode
Divya Seth as Anupriya Patel
Hera Mishra as Anya Sammit Patel
Amit Sadh as Sammit Patel
Rajesh Khattar as Dr. Manohar Patel
Zakir Hussain as Bala Banne
Barkha Bisht as Prachi Banne
Nivedita Saraf as Gayatri Jaykar
Sanjay Gurbaxani as Shekher Bakshi
Kiran Srinivas as Nikhil Pradhan
Sparsh Walia as Laksh Ranade
Vitthal Patil as Victor Telkar
Tanuka Laghate as Neelam Singh
Meenal Kapoor as Teesta Basu
Mahadev Singh lakhawat as Dheeraj kumar

Reception 

Duranga received mostly positive reviews from critics. Ruchi Kaushal of Hindustan Times wrote, "Creator Goldie Behl deserves a bow this time for the clarity with which he presents the intense, multi-climax drama.". Saibal Chatterjee of NDTV gave it 3 stars and concludes,"  it delivers a steady stream of twists and turns designed to keep you hooked from start to finish." Nandini Ramnath of Scroll.in wrote, "Once you accept Duranga’s premise – the son of a serial killer himself accused of murder who marries a police officer while on the run from the law – it’s easy enough to swallow everything that follows.". Manisha Lakhe of Network18 remarked, "Zee 5 has hit the jackpot with this show. This could trigger a trend of production companies seeking K-dramas for remakes.".

On the contrary, Lakshana N Palat of The Indian Express rated it low and wrote "Duranga misses each opportunity to craft a deeply moving, impactful and suspense-ridden show."

References

External links 

 
 Duranga on ZEE5

2022 Indian television series debuts
Crime thriller web series
Indian crime television series
Indian web series
ZEE5 original programming